School District 10 Arrow Lakes is a school district in British Columbia. The districts 5 schools are located in the communities of Nakusp, New Denver, Edgewood and Burton.

Schools

See also
List of school districts in British Columbia

Arrow Lakes
Slocan Valley
10